Cyril Hunter (8 February 1898 – 1962) was an English professional footballer who played in the Football League for South Shields, Brentford and Lincoln City as a centre half. While a South Shields player, he received a six-month ban (then the longest in English football history) for exceptional rough play in a Second Division match versus rivals Middlesbrough in March 1927. He was sent off in a Gateshead reserve team match in April 1931 and was suspended until the end of the 1931–32 season.

Career statistics

References

1898 births
People from the Metropolitan Borough of Gateshead
Footballers from Tyne and Wear
English footballers
English Football League players
Brentford F.C. players
Leadgate Park F.C. players
Date of death missing
South Shields F.C. (1889) players
Fall River Marksmen players
Lincoln City F.C. players
Gateshead F.C. players
American Soccer League (1921–1933) players
English expatriate footballers
English expatriate sportspeople in the United States
Expatriate soccer players in the United States
1962 deaths
Association football wing halves